The Cohasset Snuff Film is a 2012 American found footage horror film directed by Edward Payson.

Plot
The film takes place in Cohasset, Massachusetts and chronicles the exploits of 17-year-old Collin Mason. Mason is a vlogger who goes on to record himself murdering three of his classmates, before uploading the footage to the internet using BitTorrent.

Cast
Stephen Wu - Collin Mason
Kelly Marie Tran - Christine Chan
Maria Olsen - Melissa Wick

Release
The Cohasset Snuff Film received primarily negative reviews, criticizing the camerawork and underwhelming special effects.

References

External links

Found footage films
2012 horror films
2012 films
Films set in Massachusetts
Films about snuff films
2010s English-language films